Hærens Jegerkommando was a special forces unit of the Norwegian military. It was the armed forces competence centre for commando, airborne and counter terrorist duty in the Norwegian Army. Its headquarters were located 30 kilometres north of Elverum in the southeast of Norway, at Rena leir military base.
In 2006, the unit was merged with Forsvarets Spesialkommando/Special Operations Commando.

Etymology
 Hærens Jegerkommando  directly translated to English means:
"the Army's"( Hærens ) +
"hunter/huntsman (which in Norwegian military terminology, relates to scouts (involved in reconnaissance))" ( Jeger- ) +
"an administrative/operative command" ( -kommando ).

English translations of the unit's name, include:
"Army's Special Forces Command", "Army's Reconnaissance Command", "Army's Ranger Command" or possibly "Army Huntsmen Command")

History

Name changes
The unit was established as Hærens Fallskjermjegerskole in 1962. It was renamed Hærens Jegerskole in 1968, and its location was Trandum (near Jessheim). The name Hærens Jegerkommando was introduced in 1997. In 2014 the name was changed from FSK/HJK to simply; FSK. Also in 2013 FSK left the Army branch and, together with Marinejegerkommandoen/Naval Special Operations Commando, was organised under the joint command Norwegian Special Operations Command (NORSOCOM).

Headquarters
Headquarters are at Rena leir military base, which received its first active units in 1997 after the base had been constructed in 1993–96.

Organization
FSK is a special operations force (SOF). (Another special operations force of the Norwegian military is MJK (Marinejegerkommandoen).)

FSK had a large HQ unit and a paratrooper unit, which trained personnel from all branches of the Norwegian military in parachute operations. The Pathfinder platoon was part of the HJK training cadre and consisted of conscripts deemed suitable for service in the unit after a selection period. The role of this unit was to annually train one platoon of jump-qualified recce soldiers.

Chain of command
The Hærens Jegerkommando together with the Forsvarets Spesialkommando are under a command named FSK. The FSK itself is under direct command of the General Inspector of the Army.

Missions outside of Norway

In Kosovo
HJK was the first special forces unit to enter Pristina. The HJK's mission was to level the negotiating field between the belligerent parties, and to fine-tune the detailed, local deals needed to implement the peace deal between Serbian authorities and the Kosovo Albanians.

In Afghanistan
On 23 July 2007 HJK lieutenant Tor Arne Lau Henriksen was killed in a short and intense close quarters engagement between a Norwegian special forces reconnaissance patrol and hostile fighters in Logar Province, Afghanistan.

William H. McRaven, a United States Navy vice admiral, who served as the commander of Joint Special Operations Command (JSOC), said in an interview with a Norwegian newspaper in 2007 that he regarded the Special forces of Norway to be among the top special forces in the world and that one of his favourite operations was the Norwegian heavy water sabotage by the Norwegian resistance forces during World War II.

Commanding officers
Dag Garshol (from 2008 until present)
Torgeir Gråtrud (from 2004 to 2008)
Lieutenant Colonel Karl Egil Hanevik(1996 −2004)

Weapons
 P80 – Pistol
 Heckler & Koch USP Tactical 9mm – Pistol
 Heckler & Koch MP5 – Submachine gun
 Heckler & Koch MP7 – Submachine gun
 Benelli M1 Super 90 – Shotgun
 Diemaco C8 SFW – Assault rifle
 Heckler & Koch HK-416 – Assault Rifle
 kongsberg vapenfabrikk AG-3 – Battle Rifle
 Heckler & Koch HK417D20RS – Sniper rifle
 MSG-90A1 – Sniper rifle
 Sako TRG-42 – Sniper rifle
 Accuracy International AWMF – Sniper Rifle
 Barrett M82A1 – Anti-materiel rifle
 FN Minimi 5,56 Para TR – LMG
Rheinmetall MG3 – GPMG
 Browning M2 – HMG
 AG-C – Grenade launcher
 Raufoss Ammunisjonsfabrikker M72 –  Light anti-armor weapon
 Carl Gustav recoilless rifle – Recoilless rifle
 M-DN61 – Hand grenade

References

Notes

Army units and formations of Norway
Special forces of Norway
Airborne units and formations
Recipients of the Presidential Unit Citation (United States)